In the Bemani series of rhythm video games by Konami, it appears that seemingly hundreds of different musicians and groups perform the songs. However, in reality there exists only a core group of a few dozen Konami artists, performing under pseudonyms and forming new groups.

All names are in Western order (family name last).

This list does not include artists whose songs have been licensed by Konami, primarily through the Dancemania division of Toshiba-EMI.

A-G 

 Akira Yamaoka (left in 2009)
Mainly composes for the Beatmania IIDX and Silent Hill series
 AKIRA YAMAOKA
 ric (sound producer of)
 riewo (sound producer of)
 DETROIAN
 新谷あきら (member of)

 Erica Ash
 OKUYATOS (member of)
 Chel Y. (member of) [DDR PC OST]

H-K 

 Hideki Naganuma
 長沼英樹

 Jennifer Freeman
 Jenny F. [DDR PC OST]

 Kosuke Saito
Mainly composes for the Beatmania IIDX series.
 kors k (primary pseudonym)
 disconation
 StripE
 Teranoid
 Eagle
 LIA (sound producer for) [IIDX 11 OST]
 Chonan Chiharu (possibly name of vocalist)
 Hardcore United Tokyo (member of)
 BONUS (member of)

L-O 

 Masafumi Takada
 高田雅史

 Naoki Maeda (left in 2013)
 NAOKI
 DE-SIRE
 TËЯRA (member of)

P-S 

 Riyu Kosaka

 小坂りゆ (primary pseudonym)
 BeForU (member of)
 りゆ & のりあ (Riyu & Noria) (used on "☆shining☆")
 MIKI ROBERTS (used on "Baby's Tears" DDR SuperNOVA ver.)

 Ryutaro Nakahara
Mainly composes for the Beatmania IIDX series.
 Ryu☆ (primary pseudonym)
 Ryu
 Ryu*
 青龍 (originally used for Cardinal Gate in Beatmania IIDX)
 Kraken
 HHH (member of)
 Cream puff (member of)
 Another Infinity (member of)
 Vandalusia改 (member of)

 Sayaka Minami
 南さやか (primary pseudonym)
 BeForU NEXT (member of)
 BeForU (member of)

 Seiji Koga
 DRAGOON

T-Z 

 Takanori Nishikawa (alive)
 T.M. Revolution

 Takeo Miratsu (deceased)
 Twin AmadeuS

 Thomas Lorello
 Tommie Sunshine

 Tomosuke Funaki
 TOMOSUKE
 Zektbach
 Caldeira / Galdeira (member of)
 Orange Lounge (member of)
 Dormir (with vocalist crimm)

 Yoma Komatsu
 BeForU (member of)
 Disっ娘 (Diskko) (member of)

 Yoshitaka Nishimura
 DJ YOSHITAKA (primary pseudonym)
 DJ Yoshitaka
 朱雀 (originally used for Cardinal Gate in Beatmania IIDX)
 Humanoid
 Lucky Vacuum
 A/I (sound producer for)
 Caldeira / Galdeira (member of)
 Creative Life (member of)
 The Plastic Ambition (member of)
 VENUS (member of)
 Michael a la Mode (voice of)

External links 
 https://web.archive.org/web/20060303170810/http://www.konami.co.jp/am/bm2dx/
 http://www.konami.jp/bemani/gfdm/
 http://www.konami.jp/bemani/popn/

References 

Konami people
Video game musicians
Lists of musicians by genre